Phlegmasia may refer to:
Inflammation
Either of the following conditions:
Phlegmasia cerulea dolens, an uncommon severe form of deep venous thrombosis.
Phlegmasia alba dolens, resulting in a white appearance of the leg.